Colón (mostly referred as Colón) is a metro station of the Metrovalencia network in Valencia, Spain. It is situated on Carrer de Colom, in the southeastern part of the city centre. The station is an underground structure.

Notes 

Metrovalencia stations